The JCB Championship is an English stop on men's golf's European Senior Tour. It was first played in 2022 and is held at the JCB Golf & Country Club in Staffordshire.

The tournament is hosted by Darren Clarke of Northern Ireland. 

Alex Čejka won the inaugural event ahead of Paul McGinley.

Winners

References

External links

Coverage on the European Seniors Tour's official site 

European Senior Tour events
Golf tournaments in England